The 2014–15 Burundi Ligue A season, also known as the Amstel Ligue for sponsorship reasons, was the 52nd edition of the top flight football competition in Burundi. The league was expanded from fourteen to sixteen teams and began on 19 September 2014 and concluded on 31 May 2015. Vital'O was crowned as champion with thirteen points ahead of the defending champion, LLB Sport 4 Africa.

Teams 
A total of sixteen clubs participate in this season. Twelve teams from previous season and four new promoted sides.

Promoted from Ligue B
 Rusizi
 Olympic Star
 Le Messager Bujumbura
 Abawigeze

Relegated from Ligue A
 Espoir de Mutimbuzi
 Flamengo de Ngagara

 Other changes
 Abawigeze FC was renamed as Nyanza United.

 Guêpiers du Lac was renamed as Bujumbura City.

 LLB Académic was renamed as LLB Sport 4 Africa.

Stadiums and locations

League table

Results

All teams play in a double round robin system (home and away).

References

Burundi Premier League seasons
Premier League
Premier League
Burundi